The Joseph L. Rotman School of Management (commonly known as the Rotman School of Management, the Rotman School or just Rotman) is the University of Toronto's graduate business school, located in Downtown Toronto. The University of Toronto has been offering undergraduate courses in commerce and management since 1901, but the business school was formally established in 1950 as the Institute of Business Administration. The name was changed to the Faculty of Management Studies in 1972 and subsequently shortened to the Faculty of Management in 1986. The school was renamed in 1997 after Joseph L. Rotman (1935–2015), its principal benefactor.

The school offers undergraduate, graduate and doctoral programs in business administration, finance and commerce, including full-time, part-time and executive MBA programs along with a Master of Finance program, a Master of Management Analytics, the Master of Financial Risk Management, a Graduate Diploma in Professional Accounting, and a doctoral program, the Rotman PhD. Additionally, in collaboration with other schools at the university and abroad, it offers a DBA with the Henley Business School, University of Reading, UK, combined MBA degrees with the Faculty of Law (JD/MBA), the Faculty of Applied Science and Engineering (Skoll BASc/MBA), and the Munk School of Global Affairs (MBA/MGA); and Collaborative Programs in Asia-Pacific Studies and Environmental Studies.

Out of 113 faculty members, 98% have doctorates. Roger Martin, who served as the school's dean from 1998 to 2013, is considered by Business Week as one of the most influential management thinkers in the world.

The school publishes the Rotman Management, a magazine featuring the insights of Rotman faculty and global thought leaders.

History
The programs for which the Rotman School of Management is now responsible had their origins in 1901 when a diploma program in Commerce was inaugurated in the Faculty of Arts. This was transformed into a Bachelor of Arts program in Commerce and Finance in 1909 and into a Bachelor of Commerce program in 1920. These programs had a strong liberal arts emphasis which the BCom program still tries to retain. A Master of Commerce program was started in the Faculty of Arts in 1938 to provide a more professional program. In 1950 the MCom program was transferred into the newly created Institute of Business Administration with a Director as its head. The degree was changed to Master of Business Administration in 1960 and the institute was renamed the School of Business. It was elevated to the status of a Faculty with a Dean in 1972 and renamed the Faculty of Management Studies. The name was shortened to Faculty of Management in 1986 and was named the Joseph L. Rotman School of Management in 1997 in honour of its principal benefactor. It still, however, retains its status as a Faculty in the University of Toronto.

A Doctor of Philosophy program was begun in 1969 to develop its research orientation and to provide business school faculty for Canadian universities. In 1982 the School assumed responsibility for teaching the Commerce courses within the BCom program and in 1992 the BCom program became a joint program of the Faculty of Arts and Science and of the Rotman School. In 1983 the School began a privately financed Executive MBA program. In 1989 a privately funded MBA in professional accounting was added. In 1996 it was moved to the University of Toronto Mississauga and the degree changed to Master of Management & Professional Accounting. The School also offers a variety of non-degree Executive Development Programs and operates a number of research centres which complement its teaching and research activities.

Change to Rotman School of Management
In 1995, the Joseph L. Rotman Centre for Management, funded in part by a $3 million donation made by Joseph Rotman in 1993, was opened and the Faculty of Management shifted its base to its current building after previously moving locations multiple times. The center was later expanded with additions to the upper floors along with a new South Building, with the original building now known as the North Building. The school was renamed as the Joseph L. Rotman School of Management in 1997, in honour of a $15 million donation of its principal benefactor, Joseph Rotman, to be paid out over a period of time ending in 2011.

Rotman's donation was particularly controversial, as examined in a 1997 cover story of The Varsity. The donor agreement included several clauses that could limit the university and faculty of management's academic freedom. The agreement required that "U of T [rank] the faculty of management as one of its 'highest priorities' for the allocation of university funding, ensuring to its ‘best efforts’ that business education receives continuing focus." Bill Graham, then-president of the University of Toronto Faculty Association, was among the most vocal opponents of the original agreement, noted “the unqualified support for the ‘vision,’ and it talked about non-qualified support for and commitment to the values and principles underlying the ‘vision’ by the members of the faculty of management, as well as the central administration". The donation agreement underwent some substantial revisions, but the Rotman Foundation retained the right to "bring in an outside expert from the Association of American Universities to recommend policy changes if it was felt that the school of management was failing to live up to the criteria set out in the agreement". The school, however, retains its status as a Faculty in the University of Toronto.

In 1998, former management consultant Roger Martin was appointed Dean of the School, and during his tenure he oversaw the changes mandated by the Rotman Foundation. Martin's high profile and outspokenness caused some conflict with the other University faculties, notwithstanding, he was credited with "[transforming] what was a small, rather inconsequential regional player in Canada into a world-class institution offering a more differentiated MBA program focused around integrative thinking, self-development and business design".

In the year 2000, Marcel Desautels, founder, president and CEO of the Canadian Credit Management Foundation helped in creating Marcel Desautels Centre for Integrative Thinking with a $10-million gift. Rotman developed a new model of business education based on integrative thinking in the same year. The Michael Lee-Chin Family Institute for Corporate Citizenship (originally the AIC Institute for Corporate Citizenship) was established at Rotman in 2004 with a $10-million gift from Michael Lee-Chin. The same year, Rotman completed an expansion of its campus. In recent years, the school has received significant funding from private and public quarters.

In 2011, Rotman's academic expenditures were $71 million for 1,500 students (the Faculty of Architecture spent $7 million for 400 students), comparable to that of the University of Toronto Scarborough campus. Part of those costs were attributed to the high salaries paid to faculty, as six of the top 10 salaries paid to University of Toronto employees for 2012 went to Rotman professors and administrators, according to the Ontario Ministry of Finance Public Sector Salary Disclosure ("sunshine list"). Roger Martin, the longtime dean of the school, argued that “It’s extremely expensive to have a good business school. So the salaries are higher; in order to get world-class faculty you have to pay those salaries. Student services are greater". The Financial Times showed that Rotman graduates saw an average salary increase of slightly over 100 percent after finishing their degrees.

Rankings

In the 2023 QS Global MBA Rankings, Rotman was ranked for business schools 1st in Canada.

In the 2022 Financial Times rankings of MBA programs, Rotman ranked 79th in the world, 1st in Canada. In the 2021 Financial Times Executive MBA programs ranking, Rotman ranked 43rd globally, 1st in Canada .

Canadian MBA Alliance 
The school is also a founding member of the Canadian MBA Alliance which was created in 2013. All six members of the alliance rank among the world's top 100 schools, according to their participation in key rankings – Financial Times, Business Week, and The Economist.

Graduate programs
The Rotman School delivers the MBA program in six formats; full-time Two-Year MBA, part-time three-year Morning MBA, part-time three-year Evening MBA, one year Executive MBA that is designed for senior managers, the Global Executive MBA, which is delivered in eight key centres of international business in six countries, and a Global Executive MBA for Healthcare and the Life Sciences. The school also offers a Master of Finance program, a Master of Management Analytics and a Graduate Diploma in Professional Accounting. In addition, it offers combined MBA degrees with the Faculty of Law (JD/MBA) and the Faculty of Applied Science and Engineering (Skoll BASc/MBA); and Collaborative Programs in Asia-Pacific Studies and Environmental Studies.

Rotman Full-Time MBA
The full-time MBA program is a two-year program. The school offers optional pre-courses in accounting, finance and quantitative methods, and professional skills workshops on topics such as academic writing and presentation skills. The first year begins in the second week of September and is divided into four quarters, covering the program's core curriculum and lasting seven weeks each. The first year curriculum consists of a 4-weeks foundation term, followed by two 9-weeks core term, and finishing with a 6-weeks capstone term. In the second year, the students are required to complete, over the time of three terms, 10 elective courses out of 80 course drawn from the areas of Accounting, Business economics, Finance, General and integrative thinking, Organizational behavior/Human resource management, Marketing, Operations management, Management science and statistics, and Strategic management.

The school offers MBA degree with majors in Brand management, Consulting, Funds management, Global management, Health sector management, Human resources management, Innovation and entrepreneurship, Investment banking, and Risk management and financial engineering. The student can major with one or more specialization depending on the elective courses taken in the second year.

The students can spend an entire term in second year on an international exchange program. Study tours to various parts of the world are also conducted for second year students.

As part of Rotman's planned expansion, the full-time MBA program annual class expanded to 350 students. International students constitute 52% of the Full-Time MBA class and 40% of the class are female. The students of the 2019 class represented 35 countries though the majority of students were from North America and Asia. The average age of the full-time MBA students at the start of the program is 27 years and the students have 4 years of work experience on average.

The Rotman Full-Time MBA tuition fees, for the class of 2019 have been increased to $101,350 for Canadian citizens and Permanent Residents, and to $109,970 for International Students, making it the most expensive MBA program in Canada.

Rotman Morning/Evening MBA
The Rotman Morning & Evening MBA programs are part-time MBAs designed for working professionals who want to pursue a graduate degree while maintaining their career momentum. The program takes place over 32 months.

Students also complete three one-week-long sessions at various points in the first two years. Electives, offered in the second and third year, may be taken in the morning, evening or during regular working hours (depending on availability).

Rotman Master of Finance
Launched in 2006, the Master of Finance program is designed for working professionals in the finance field. Classes are held one evening per week plus every other Saturday over a 20-month period. The program offers content that is deeper and broader than that provided by a CFA or other professional finance programs.

Rotman Executive MBA programs
The Rotman One-Year MBA for Executives (EMBA) is an intensive, 13-month program aims for professionals. It allows business leaders to earn a degree without interrupting their careers.

Offered over 18 months, the Rotman Global Executive MBA program immerses mid-to-senior executives in core business disciplines from a global perspective. The program, supported by well-known post-secondary institutions in Brazil, India, Hong Kong and China, brings participants together in cross-cultural study teams to gain business experience in the world's main economic regions. Candidates are mid-to-senior level professionals from industry, providers and service delivery organizations, consulting firms, public agencies, science, and payers in the healthcare and life sciences sector around the world who seek to advance their leadership careers.

Starting in September 2019, the Global Executive MBA for Healthcare and the Life Sciences is an 18-month program that brings professionals to three key healthcare clusters around the world: Toronto, the Bay area and Singapore. Candidates are mid-to-senior level professionals from industry, providers and service delivery organizations, consulting firms, public agencies, science, and payers in the healthcare and life sciences sector around the world who seek to advance their leadership careers.

Other programs
The Master of Financial Risk Management program prepares students with strong analytic and quantitative skills for careers in the finance industry. The eight-month program includes a 2-month risk management project, which partners students to work with risk management professionals to tackle a real issue of interest to financial institutions.

The Graduate Diploma in Professional Accounting is a 12-week summer program that deepens the' knowledge of accounting while satisfying four modules of the CPA Professional Education Program (CPA PEP). The program prepares students for the Common Final Examination (CFE) and allows them to advance straight to the Capstone 1 module in the CPA PEP. Students with employment offers from an accounting firm before or after starting the GDipPA should inquire with their employer about potential tuition subsidies.

The JD/MBA program is a four-year degree offered by the Rotman School and the University of Toronto's Faculty of Law. This program combines graduate training in management with a degree in law. Taken separately, these two degrees would take five years to complete.

The Jeffrey Skoll BASc/MBA program brings together undergraduate studies in engineering and an MBA. It is oriented towards careers in technology-based businesses.

The Master of Financial Economics program is offered jointly with the Department of Economics. It includes a two semesters of coursework, a summer internship, followed by one more semester of classes.

The Collaborative Program in Asia-Pacific Studies is a collaborative master's degree program, taken alongside the MBA program. It provides advanced training in the historical and social science studies of modern East and Southeast Asia.

Students admitted to the MBA program can apply to the Collaborative Program in Environmental Studies, a collaborative program offered through the University of Toronto’s Centre for Environment.

Doctoral programs
The PhD program offers degrees in accounting, economic analysis and policy, finance, marketing, operations management, organizational behaviour & human resource management, and strategic management. Also, a joint degree in management and economics is offered (Master in Financial Economics).

Undergraduate program
The Rotman Commerce program (formerly Commerce) is an undergraduate program administered jointly by the University of Toronto's Faculty of Arts and Science and the Rotman School of Management. In April 2008, the program was renamed as Rotman Commerce after a $2.5 million gift from Sandra and Joseph Rotman. Although the program name has changed, the B.Com. degree continues to be awarded by the Faculty of Arts and Science. There are three specializations for Rotman Commerce students: Accounting, Finance and Economics, or Management. Every student also completes the requirements for a minor in Economics. Students have the freedom to take any course from the Faculty of Arts and Science, allowing them to include with their specialist, any additional major, or minor. Rotman Commerce has many international study opportunities for students. It has 24 partner universities. Every year, the University of Toronto Summer Abroad Program also offers full-year Rotman Commerce courses in other countries.

Non-degree programs

Capital Markets Institute
The Capital Markets Institute at the Rotman School of Management works towards fostering a clear understanding of the challenges facing the Canadian capital markets, and the institutional tools that Canada must develop in order to convert those challenges into opportunities to be a leader among the world's small, open capital markets. The focus of CMI's research is to identify the areas in which Canada should not seek to compete with larger markets, in order to maintain its strategic focus on those areas where it has or can develop a competitive advantage as well as areas where it must raise its performance to compete effectively. The CMI seeks to provide leadership to the Canadian academic and business communities to channel their resources into meaningful policy improvements. The institute provides scholarships to students who wish to pursue research in the area of the capital markets in conjunction with their graduate studies in Law or Finance.

Centre for Health Sector Strategy
The Centre for Health Sector Strategy was inaugurated in 2004 and is a key area of focused research for the Rotman School. Under the direction of Professor Brian R. Golden and a board of advisors from industry, government and academia, the Centre for Health Sector Strategy drives a research agenda that is aimed at producing actionable management knowledge for the health sector and the life sciences. Major areas of research are commercialization of life-sciences products and services; role of the private sector in healthcare delivery and technology; alliances (public-public, private-private, public-private) in healthcare; performance management, governance and control; organizational redesign and system integration and sustainability of public funding in Canadian healthcare. The industry domain of the Centre includes pharmaceutical and biotechnology, medical technology, medical informatics, hospitals and long-term care, and insurance.

The central focus of the centre is original research, intended to inform the management and organization of the health sector. A corollary of this focus is the centre's support of knowledge transfer and uptake, through education as well as scholarly and managerial publications.

Clarkson Centre for Business Ethics & Board Effectiveness
The Clarkson Centre for Business Ethics and Board Effectiveness (CCBE) is the locus of corporate governance research and communications at the Rotman School of Management. The Centre monitors Canadian corporate governance trends and provides guidance to firms looking to improve their board effectiveness and disclosure. It focuses on CEO compensation disclosure, study of small and medium-sized enterprises’ governance, and tracking the governance impact of directors who sit on the boards of four or more TSX Index-listed companies.

Since 2002, CCBE's annual Board Shareholder Confidence Index has become the standard by which Canadian governance best practices are measured.

Creative Destruction Lab at Rotman
The Creative Destruction Lab at Rotman is an entrepreneurial program and space within the Rotman School of Management at the University of Toronto. Its purpose is to work with Students, Faculty, and Alumni from the University of Toronto that have the potential to build massively scalable companies. The program runs for eight months of the year and is built around reporting milestones to a board, called the G7 fellows, of very successful entrepreneurs. The founding G7 fellows group includes; Daniel Debow, Dennis Bennie, Dan Shimmerman, Nigel Stokes, Lee Lau, Tomi Poutanen, and Nick Koudas.

Notable alumni
 Jim Balsillie, Retired co-CEO, Research in Motion
 George R. Gardiner, Financier and Past President, Toronto Stock Exchange; Founder, Gardiner Museum
 Donald Guloien, President and CEO, Manulife Financial Corporation
 Daisy Ho (何超鳳), Chairman of SJM Holdings and executive director of Shun Tak Holdings, daughter of Macau tycoon Stanley Ho (何鴻燊)
 Michael H. Wilson, P.C., C.C., LL.D., Chancellor, University of Toronto; chairman, Barclays Capital Canada Inc.
 William A. Downe, CEO of the Bank of Montreal from 2007 to 2017

Campus
Rotman is located in the heart of the University of Toronto's downtown St. George Campus. There are several noteworthy features of the building (completed in 1995) that houses the school:
 The Fleck Atrium is a large area on the main (ground) floor which is often used for special events, receptions, and public lectures. It occupies the central area of the building, with an open-air concept that allows individuals on the 2nd and 3rd floors of the building to observe from above. The vaulted ceiling of the atrium is made from glass, creating a brightness throughout the interior space.
 The Business Information Centre is the school's library, and is a branch of the University of Toronto's library system.
 The Financial Research and Trading Lab is a state-of-the-art facility allowing students access to a wide range of financial analysis software packages and data sets. A variety of business competitions are held in the lab throughout the year. In particular the Rotman International Trading Competition (RITC) is an annual trading competition featuring universities from around the world.
 The Self Development Lab prepares Rotman's Full Time MBA students for better interpersonal and communication skills in problem-solving.
 A CAD $4 million expansion of the building, completed in 2005, added about a dozen new faculty/administrative offices and some meeting rooms to each of the 4th and 5th floors of the building. The newly created space also houses the Marcel Desautels Centre for Integrative Thinking.

To accommodate dramatic growth of the program, the school expanded into a new $91.8-million building designed by KPMB Architects which opened in September 2012. The new building, adjacent to and fully integrated with the existing structure, nearly doubles the size of the facilities to provide more space for research and education.

References

External links
 

Business schools in Canada
University of Toronto
Postmodern architecture in Canada
1950 establishments in Canada